Euplectus is a genus of ant-loving beetles in the family Staphylinidae. There are about 13 described species in Euplectus.

Species
 Euplectus acomanus Casey, 1908
 Euplectus californicus Casey, 1887
 Euplectus confluens LeConte, 1849
 Euplectus duryi Casey, 1908
 Euplectus elongatus Brendel, 1893
 Euplectus episcopalis Park, in Park, Wagner and Sanderson, 1976
 Euplectus filiformis (Casey, 1908)
 Euplectus idahoensis Park and Wagner, 1962
 Euplectus karsteni (Reichenbach, 1816)
 Euplectus karstenii (Reichenbach, 1816)
 Euplectus longicollis Casey, 1884
 Euplectus signatus (Reichenbach, 1816)
 Euplectus silvicolus Chandler, 1986

References

Further reading

 
 
 
 
 
 

Pselaphinae